The Negro Society for Historical Research (NSHR) was an organization founded by John Edward Bruce and Arthur Alfonso Schomburg in 1911.

Bruce and Schomburg originally met because of their Masonic involvement and began attending a Sunday Men's Club that met in Bruce's apartment. The NSHR, based in Yonkers, New York, aimed to create an institute to support Pan-African—African, West Indian and Afro-American—scholarly efforts. Schomburg stated "We need a collection or list of books written by our own men and women.... We need the historian and philosopher to give us, with trenchant pen, the story of our forefathers and let our soul and body, with phosphorescent light, brighten the chasm that separates us."

The NSHR's constitution listed its purpose "to instruct the race and to inspire love and veneration for its men and women of mark." Membership in the society was limited to twenty active members and they started with a collection of 150 titles. Members endeavored to gather books, pamphlets and other manuscripts by writers of color worldwide. Meetings took place in members' homes and would often involve prominent black speakers. 

Alain LeRoy Locke spoke at their first annual meeting and became a Corresponding Member for the society which partially sponsored his trip to Egypt in 1924. They shared many members and goals with the American Negro Academy and the Universal Negro Improvement Association and African Communities League. The society's collection became a lending library that operated out of Schomburg's apartment, available to members and "anyone else interested in black history."

When the organization disbanded, the  collection later became the foundation for NYPL's Schomburg Collection of Negro Literature and Art which became the Schomburg Center for Research in Black Culture in Harlem.

See also
Association for the Study of African American Life and History

References

African-American history of New York (state)
African Americans and education
African-American literature
Clubs and societies in the United States
Learned societies of the United States
1911 establishments in New York (state)
Pan-Africanism